Bir al-Helou al-Wardiya Subdistrict is a subdistrict of al-Hasakah District in eastern al-Hasakah Governorate, northeastern Syria. The administrative centre is the municipality of Bir al-Helou. At the 2004 census, it had a population of 38,833.

Cities, towns and villages

References 

Al-Hasakah District
Bir al-Helou al-Wardiya